The VAG Class DT2 is an electric multiple unit (EMU) train type operated by the Verkehrs-Aktiengesellschaft Nürnberg on the Nuremberg U-Bahn system. It is a derivative of the MVG Class B, in service on the Munich U-Bahn since 1981.

Formation
Every DT2 train consists of two permanently-coupled cars, forming a twin-unit.

Interior
Seating accommodation consists of transverse seating bays with ergonomically shaped seats. The interior features less seating spaces than the interior of the VAG Class DT1, in order to provide more space for luggage and standing passengers.

Technical specifications
The design is derived from the MVG Class B. The car bodies are made out of aluminium, and the trains are powered by three-phase motors. Unlike its predecessor DT1 and the related Class B, the three-phase motors of the DT2 are arranged transverse to the direction of travel.
Besides the power supply by contact shoes, every unit is also equipped with a pantograph, as parts of the maintenance facilities are electrified with overhead lines.

History
As a further order of DT1 trains was deemed unpractical due to the age of the technical design, a newly developed train type was ordered. Twelve sets were built by MAN between 1993 and 1994.

The order of 21 VAG Class G1 trains from Siemens also includes an option for six additional sets, which would replace the DT2 trains.

References

External links

 VAG fleet information 

Nuremberg U-Bahn
Electric multiple units of Germany
750 V DC multiple units